Poul Petersen (25 August 1912 – 14 February 1959) was a Danish freestyle swimmer. He competed in three events at the 1936 Summer Olympics.

References

External links
 

1912 births
1959 deaths
People from Odsherred Municipality
Danish male freestyle swimmers
Olympic swimmers of Denmark
Swimmers at the 1936 Summer Olympics
Sportspeople from Region Zealand